Gabriel Barbosa Almeida (born 30 August 1996), commonly known as Gabigol or Gabi, is a Brazilian professional footballer who plays as a forward for Campeonato Brasileiro Série A club Flamengo and the Brazil national team.

A graduate of the Santos academy, Gabriel made his professional debut at the age of 16 and made over 200 appearances for the club across all competitions. Playing for Flamengo since 2019, he quickly became a fan favourite after scoring twice in the final minutes of the 2019 Copa Libertadores Final and again in the 2022 Copa Libertadores Final.

Club career

Early career
Born in São Bernardo do Campo, São Paulo, Gabriel joined Santos FC's youth setup in 2004, at the age of 8; his prolific goalscoring with the club's youth sides saw him earn the nickname Gabigol. On 25 September 2012, he signed a professional contract, with a €50 million buyout clause, and made his first team debut on 17 January of the following year, in a friendly match against Grêmio Barueri.

Santos

On 26 May 2013, Gabriel made his league debut, at only 16 years old, in a 0–0 draw against Flamengo. He scored his first professional goal on 22 August, netting the game's only goal in a home success against Grêmio, for the year's Copa do Brasil.

On 1 February 2014, Gabriel scored a brace and Santos' 12,000th goal in a 5–1 victory against Botafogo-SP, for that year's Campeonato Paulista championship. He finished the tournament with seven goals, as Peixe finished second.

Gabriel netted his first Série A goal on 20 April 2014, scoring his side's only in a 1–1 home draw against Sport Recife. He signed a new five-year deal with the club on 23 September, and finished the season with 21 goals, ten ahead of high-spending Leandro Damião.

After starting the 2015 campaign on the bench, Gabriel was appointed as first-choice after the departure of Robinho. He scored ten goals in the year's Brasileirão, and was the top scorer in Copa do Brasil with eight goals, with highlights including braces against Sport Recife, Joinville and Atlético Mineiro, and the winner in the first leg of the national cup's final against Palmeiras. His impressive form for the season with Santos also saw him named by Spanish sport magazine Don Balón as one of 101 best young talents in world football in 2015

Gabriel started the 2016 season with two consecutive goals, against São Bernardo and Ponte Preta. On 24 April he scored a double in a 2–2 home draw against Palmeiras (3–2 win on penalties), as his side reached the finals of the Paulistão for the eight consecutive time.

Inter
On 27 August 2016, after being warmly welcomed by Inter fans once landed in Milan the day before, Gabriel signed for Inter Milan on a five-year deal in a deal reportedly worth €29.5m.

On 22 September 2016, the club officially introduced Gabigol as an Inter player in the auditorium Pirelli with a media show: the striker entered the press room after a video showing him below the statue of Christ the Redeemer in Rio de Janeiro and then on Milan rooftops, clearly evoking the spot Inter had realized to introduce Il Fenomeno Ronaldo in the past.

Gabigol made his first appearance on 25 September 2016, subbing Candreva in the 73rd minute. He scored his first goal for Inter on 19 February after coming on as a substitute in a 1–0 away victory against Bologna.

Benfica (loan)
On 31 August 2017, Gabriel joined Portuguese club Benfica on a season-long loan deal. He made his debut on 12 September in a UEFA Champions League match against CSKA Moscow, replacing Álex Grimaldo in the 77th minute.

Gabriel made his Primeira Liga debut in a 2–1 loss at Boavista on 16 September 2017; he replaced Andrija Zivkovic, again in the 77th minute. He left the club in January with just 165 minutes of playtime and one goal scored, against Olhanense for the Taça de Portugal.

Return to Santos (loan)
On 25 January 2018, Gabriel's former club Santos announced that they had reached an agreement with Inter for his return to the club on a one-year loan deal. He made his re-debut for the club on 11 February, starting and scoring his team's second in a 2–2 away draw against Ferroviária.

Gabriel made his Copa Libertadores debut on 1 March 2018, starting in a 2–0 away loss against Real Garcilaso. On 11 May, he scored a hat-trick – the first of his professional career – in a 5–1 home routing of Luverdense, for the year's national cup.

On 1 September 2018, Gabriel scored all his team's goals in a 3–0 away win against Vasco da Gama.

Flamengo (loan)

On 11 January 2019 Flamengo officially announced an agreement with Inter Milan to sign Gabriel on loan until 31 December 2019.

Gabriel debuted for Flamengo on 23 January 2019 in a Campeonato Carioca 1–1 draw against Resende, he started the match and played all 90 minutes. He scored his first goal for Flamengo on 24 February 2019 in a 4–1 win against Americano, this was the first match of a six-game streak scoring including goals in Copa Libertadores matches against San José and LDU Quito and a brace against Portuguesa (RJ) and Madureira in the Campeonato Carioca. Flamengo won the 2019 Campeonato Carioca with Gabriel scoring 7 goals in 12 matches, also being selected to the tournament team of the year.

On 23 November 2019, Gabriel scored two late goals in the 2019 Copa Libertadores Final, in a 2–1 win over River Plate, when he was also sent off in the game, and became the top scorer of the competition with nine goals. Less than 24 hours later, Flamengo became champions of the Campeonato Brasileiro, with Gabriel having scored 25 league goals in the championship and becoming the first player since Túlio Maravilha in 1995 to be the nation's top goalscorer in two consecutive years; he also became the top goalscorer of the Brasileirão in the double round-robin-era, established in 2003.

Flamengo's supporters quickly adopted Gabriel as one of their favourite players and chanted the slogan Hoje tem gol do Gabigol (today Gabigol will score) frequently in the stadiums. He was awarded with the Bola de Ouro award for his efforts in Brazil and was crowned South American Footballer of the Year by Uruguayan newspaper El País.

Flamengo
On 27 January 2020, Flamengo announced that the clubs agreed on a permanent transfer and Gabriel signed a contract with the club until December 2024 with a deal reportedly worth €18.5m.

International career

Youth
In November 2011, Gabriel was called up to Brazil under-15s. On 20 June 2013, he appeared with the under-17s in a tournament in Miami.

On 22 July 2014 Gabriel was called up to the under-20s for the year's L'Alcúdia International Football Tournament. He was the competition's top scorer, but missed the final 2–0 win over Levante UD due to a dismissal in the previous game against Argentina.

Gabriel was also included in Alexandre Gallo's 23-man squad for the 2015 South American U-20 Championship held in Uruguay. He scored his first goal in the competition on 20 January 2015, netting the last in a 2–0 win against Venezuela.

In 2015, Gabriel was also called up for friendlies with the under-23 side, scoring six goals in only four matches. He was also part of the host team that won a gold medal at the 2016 Summer Olympics under manager Rogério Micale.

Gabriel scored a brace for Brazil in their final group game against Denmark in an eventual 4–0 win.

Senior
On 26 March 2016, Gabriel received his first call up to the full squad, replacing suspended Neymar for a 2018 World Cup Qualifier against Paraguay. However, he was only an unused substitute in the 2–2 draw at the Estadio Defensores del Chaco in Asunción.

On 5 May 2016, Gabriel was called up by manager Dunga to participate in the Copa América Centenario to be held in the United States, describing the call-up as a "dream". He made his full international debut on 29 May, replacing goalscorer Jonas and scoring the last in a 2–0 friendly win over Panama.

On 20 September 2019, Gabriel was called up by manager Tite for a pair of friendlies against Senegal and Nigeria played in Singapore. Gabriel was the top goalscorer of the Campeonato Brasileiro with first-place Flamengo at the time. He came on in substitute for Roberto Firmino against Nigeria.

On 6 March 2020, Gabriel was again called by Tite for the first two matches of 2022 World Cup Qualifiers against Bolivia and Peru. He was called up along with the other members of Flamengo's attacking trio, Bruno Henrique and Éverton Ribeiro.

In June 2021, he was included in Brazil's squad for the 2021 Copa América on home soil. On 13 June, in Brazil's opening group match of the tournament, he scored the final goal in a 3–0 win over Venezuela. On 10 July, he made a substitute appearance in his nation's 1–0 defeat to rivals Argentina in the final.

Playing style
Considered to be a talented prospect, Gabriel is known for his technical skills, creativity and use of tricks on the ball; due to his flair and flamboyant playing style, he was dubbed the "next Neymar" by the media in 2016.

During his time with Santos and Flamengo, Gabriel's role on the pitch has evolved; originally a supporting forward capable of playing with his back to goal or on the wing, he transformed into a full-on striker with the main task of finding space inside the opponent's penalty box and poaching goals. Besides his goalscoring and positioning in attack, his physique also improved, leading him to start winning more aerial duels.

Due to recent changes in his style of play, he has been compared to Mauro Icardi, his former teammate at Internazionale.

A controversial figure, he struggled to make the grade in Europe and has been recently linked with a move to West Ham. South American football expert Tim Vickery was damming with his verdict: “He’s 25 already, he had one go already in Europe with Inter Milan and Benfica, and it was an absolute disaster. People spoke very badly of him, if he was chocolate he would eat himself, he swanned around like he was Pretty Boy Floyd."

Career statistics

Club

International

Scores and results list Brazil's goal tally first, score column indicates score after each Gabriel goal.

Honours
Santos
Campeonato Paulista: 2015, 2016

Flamengo
Copa Libertadores: 2019, 2022
Recopa Sudamericana: 2020
Campeonato Brasileiro Série A: 2019, 2020
 Copa do Brasil: 2022
Supercopa do Brasil: 2020, 2021
Campeonato Carioca: 2019, 2020, 2021

Brazil U23
Olympic Gold Medal: 2016

Brazil
Copa América runner-up: 2021
Individual
 Bola de Prata Best Newcomer: 2015
 Campeonato Paulista Team of the Year: 2016, 2018
 Campeonato Carioca Team of the Year: 2019, 2020, 2021, 2022
 Copa do Brasil top scorer: 2014, 2015, 2018
 Bola de Prata: 2018, 2019
 Campeonato Brasileiro Série A Team of the Year: 2018, 2019, 2020
 Campeonato Brasileiro Série A top scorer: 2018, 2019
 Bola de Ouro: 2019
Copa Libertadores Team of the Tournament: 2019, 2021, 2022
 Copa Libertadores top scorer: 2019, 2021
Copa Libertadores Best Player: 2021
South American Team of the Year: 2019, 2021, 2022
South American Footballer of the Year: 2019

References

http://www.playmakerstats.com/match.php?id=5739983

External links

1996 births
Living people
People from São Bernardo do Campo
Brazilian footballers
Association football forwards
Santos FC players
Inter Milan players
S.L. Benfica footballers
CR Flamengo footballers
Campeonato Brasileiro Série A players
Serie A players
Primeira Liga players
South American Footballer of the Year winners
Brazil youth international footballers
Brazil under-20 international footballers
Olympic footballers of Brazil
Brazil international footballers
2015 South American Youth Football Championship players
Copa América Centenario players
Copa Libertadores-winning players
2021 Copa América players
Footballers at the 2016 Summer Olympics
Olympic gold medalists for Brazil
Olympic medalists in football
Medalists at the 2016 Summer Olympics
Brazilian expatriate footballers
Brazilian expatriate sportspeople in Italy
Brazilian expatriate sportspeople in Portugal
Expatriate footballers in Italy
Expatriate footballers in Portugal
Footballers from São Paulo (state)